The Hoopeston Carnegie Public Library is a Carnegie library located at 110 N. Fourth St. in Hoopeston, Illinois. Hoopeston's library program began in 1898, when the Mary Hartwell Catherwood Club started a library in the town hall. In 1903, the program acquired a $12,500 grant from the Carnegie Foundation for a library building; the building was completed in 1904. Architect James F. Alexander designed the Classical Revival building, which features a portico entrance supported by four Tuscan columns. In 1975, an addition was placed on the building.

The building was added to the National Register of Historic Places on May 9, 2002.

References

External links
Hoopeston Public Library District website

Libraries on the National Register of Historic Places in Illinois
Neoclassical architecture in Illinois
Library buildings completed in 1904
Buildings and structures in Vermilion County, Illinois
Carnegie libraries in Illinois
National Register of Historic Places in Vermilion County, Illinois